An Old Sweetheart of Mine is a 1923 American silent drama film directed by Harry Garson and starring Elliott Dexter, Helen Jerome Eddy, and Lloyd Whitlock.

Cast
 Elliott Dexter as John Craig 
 Helen Jerome Eddy as Mary Ellen Anderson 
 Lloyd Whitlock as Stuffy Shade 
 Barbara Worth as Irene Ryan 
 Arthur Hoyt as Frederick McCann 
 Gene Cameron as William Norton 
 Pat Moore as John Craig, as a boy 
 Mary Jane Irving as Mary Ellen Anderson, as a girl 
 Turner Savage as Stuffy Shade, as a boy

References

Bibliography
 Goble, Alan. The Complete Index to Literary Sources in Film. Walter de Gruyter, 1999.

External links

1923 films
1923 drama films
Silent American drama films
Films directed by Harry Garson
American silent feature films
1920s English-language films
American black-and-white films
Metro Pictures films
1920s American films